Clinton College was a Baptist college in Clinton, Kentucky established in 1873 and opening in 1874, until its closure in 1915. Originally a girls' school called Clinton Female College, it became coeducational in 1876. The campus was eight acres in size. The school's founder was Willis White, a Baptist preacher who had served as the superintendent of schools of Hickman County. The school operated under the auspices of, first, the West Union Baptist Association, and, later, the West Kentucky Baptist Association. Students came "mainly from western Kentucky, northwestern Tennessee, and southeastern Missouri and could receive instruction from "primary to collegiate" levels." After its closure, the campus was used for Clinton High School from 1918 until 1935. In 1949, the campus was used by the West Kentucky Baptist Institution.

Notable people
 Jean Gurney Fine Spahr (1861-1935), teacher, social reformer

See also
 Marvin College Boys Dormitory and President's House: Also in Clinton, Kentucky
List of Baptist colleges and universities in the United States
List of colleges and universities in Kentucky

References

1873 establishments in Kentucky
1915 disestablishments in Kentucky
Baptist Christianity in Kentucky
Baptist universities and colleges in the United States
Hickman County, Kentucky
Defunct private universities and colleges in Kentucky
Educational institutions established in 1873
Educational institutions disestablished in 1915
History of women in Kentucky
Former women's universities and colleges in the United States